Elaeocyma arenensis is a species of sea snail, a marine gastropod mollusk in the family Drilliidae.

Description
The shell grows to a length of 45 mm.

Distribution
This species occurs in the demersal zone of the Eastern Pacific off the Gulf of California, Western Mexico

References

External links
  Tucker, J.K. 2004 Catalog of recent and fossil turrids (Mollusca: Gastropoda). Zootaxa 682:1–1295
 Biolib: image of Elaeocyma arenensis

arenensis
Gastropods described in 1951